Liho can refer to:

 an embodiment of evil fate and misfortune, see Likho
 a suco in Railaco subdistrict, East Timor, see Liho (Railaco)